Asia Pacific Screen Awards (APSA) awards The Cultural Diversity Award under the patronage of UNESCO annually to a film practitioner and film from the region for their exceptional contribution for upholding and promoting the cultural diversity through the medium of the film.

The winners of the Asia Pacific Screen Award's UNESCO Award are:

Reference List

External links
Official Website

Asia Pacific Screen Awards
Awards for best film
Lists of films by award